Cold Brook is a 2019 American fantasy drama film written by Cain Devore and William Fichtner, directed by Fichtner and starring Fichtner and Kim Coates.

Cast
William Fichtner as Ted Markham
Kim Coates as George Hildebrandt
Harold Perrineau as Gil Le Deux
Robin Weigert as Mary Ann
Mary Lynn Rajskub as Rachel
Johnny Strong as Ronnie
Brad William Henke as Chip
Erich Anderson as Meisenger
Louis Mustillo as County Clerk
Charlene Amoia as Miss Simmons
Pat Asanti as Junior
Kymberly Fichtner as Vicki

Release
The film was released on November 8, 2019.

Reception
The film has an 80% rating on Rotten Tomatoes based on ten reviews.

Nell Minow of RogerEbert.com awarded the film two stars and wrote that the film's "obvious good intentions lend it a sweetness that cannot make up for insurmountable problems."

Frank Scheck of The Hollywood Reporter gave the film a positive review and wrote, "Hard to pin down, but moving nonetheless."

References

External links